Anthony Egwunyenga (born 22 July 1943) is a Nigerian sprinter. He competed in the men's 400 metres at the 1968 Summer Olympics.

References

1943 births
Living people
Athletes (track and field) at the 1968 Summer Olympics
Athletes (track and field) at the 1970 British Commonwealth Games
Nigerian male sprinters
Olympic athletes of Nigeria
Place of birth missing (living people)
Commonwealth Games competitors for Nigeria
20th-century Nigerian people